John Gott (25 December 1830 – 21 July 1906) was the third Bishop of Truro from 1891  until his death in 1906.

Life

Gott was born in Leeds on Christmas Day 1830, the third son of William Gott, a wool merchant.
He was educated at Winchester and Brasenose College, Oxford.  He then embarked on an ecclesiastical career with a curacy at Great Yarmouth, after which he held incumbencies at Bramley, Leeds, 1871–76, and at Leeds Parish Church, where he also founded the Leeds Clergy School. 
His last post, before his ordination to the episcopate, was as Dean of Worcester from 1886. In 1873, Gott erected a stone cross in Bramley to celebrate 8 years living and working in Leeds (see photograph).

In 1891, Gott succeeded to the see of Truro on the resignation of George Howard Wilkinson. His election to that See was confirmed at St Mary-le-Bow on 28 September and he was consecrated a bishop at St Paul's Cathedral on 29 September 1891, by Edward Benson, Archbishop of Canterbury. He saw in 1903 the completion of Truro Cathedral; founded a bishop's clergy fund for the aid of clergy in time of ill-health or other necessity; and diligently visited all parts of his diocese. 
A high churchman, but not a strong partisan, he signed in January 1901 the bishops' letter inviting clergy to accept the positions defined in the Lambeth 'Opinions.'

He died suddenly at his residence, Trenython, near Par, on 21 July 1906 and was buried at Tywardreath.

Family
Gott married in 1868 Harriot Mary Maitland of Loughton Hall, Essex; she died in London on 19 April 1906; they had one son and three daughters.

Works
The Parish Priest of the Town (1887)

References

Attribution

Sources

Further reading
Brown, H. M. (1976) A Century for Cornwall. Truro: Blackford; pp. 45–58

External links
 

1830 births
1906 deaths
Clergy from Leeds
People educated at Winchester College
Alumni of Brasenose College, Oxford
Deans of Worcester
Bishops of Truro
19th-century Church of England bishops
20th-century Church of England bishops
Burials in Cornwall
19th-century Anglican theologians
20th-century Anglican theologians